The Nuchcha or Nuuchcha (Nuuçça) is a river in the Sakha Republic (Yakutia), Russia. It is the longest tributary of the Chondon.

The Nuchcha flows north of the Arctic Circle, across desolate territories of the Ust-Yansky District. An abandoned village named "Batagay" was located by the riverside in its lower course. A 2021 Yakut fictional film which received and award at the Karlovy Vary International Film Festival was named Nuuchcha.

Course
The Nuchcha is a right tributary of the Chondon. It has its sources in the northern slopes of the Kyun-Tas range. The river flows roughly northwards within a valley. After it leaves the mountainous terrain it heads across the Yana-Indigirka Lowland floodplain to the southwest of the Sellyakh. It flows slowly through flat terrain where it meanders very strongly among numerous lakes. Finally the river joins the Chondon  from its mouth.

Tributaries  
The river is frozen between the beginning of October and the beginning of June. There are more than 1,300 lakes in its basin.

See also
List of rivers of Russia

References

External links 
Fishing & Tourism in Yakutia

Tributaries of the Chondon
Rivers of the Sakha Republic
East Siberian Lowland
Chondon basin